Copaeodes is a genus of skippers in the family Hesperiidae.

Species
Copaeodes aurantiaca (Hewitson, 1868)
Copaeodes castanea Mielke, 1969
Copaeodes eoa Smith, Miller & McKenzie, 1991
Copaeodes jean Evans, 1955
Copaeodes minima (Edwards, 1870)
Copaeodes stillmani Bell & Comstock, 1948

Former species
Copaeodes eunus Edwards, 1881 - transferred to Pseudocopaeodes eunus (Edwards, 1881)

References
Natural History Museum Lepidoptera genus database
Copaeodes at funet

Hesperiinae
Hesperiidae genera